Levitsky is a rural locality (a village) in Baymurzinsky Selsoviet, Mishkinsky District, Bashkortostan, Russia. The population was 24 as of 2010. There is 1 street.

Geography 
Levitsky is located 53 km northwest of Mishkino (the district's administrative centre) by road. Baymurzino is the nearest rural locality.

References 

Rural localities in Mishkinsky District